Polystachya neobenthamia is a species of flowering plants from the orchid family, Orchidaceae. It is terrestrial, lithophilic and grows among leaf litter and other detritus on rock faces. It is endemic to Tanzania.

Description 
This species produces slender, reed-like stems, which bear distichously arranged, linear leaves. The inflorescence is erect and the rachis is bent apically. The flowers have four laterally flattened pollinia.The pollinia are relatively hard.

Taxonomy 
It was formerly placed in a separate, monotypic genus Neobenthamia Rolfe under the name Neobenthamia gracilis Rolfe. This is however now a synonym of Polystachya neobenthamia Schltr. Under the inclusion of  P. neobenthamia the genus Polystachya is a monophyletic group. This species is the sister group to Polystachya dendrobiiflora.

References 

 Pridgeon, A.M., Cribb, P.J., Chase, M.A. & Rasmussen, F. eds. (1999). Genera Orchidacearum 1. Oxford Univ. Press.
 Pridgeon, A.M., Cribb, P.J., Chase, M.A. & Rasmussen, F. eds. (2001). Genera Orchidacearum 2. Oxford Univ. Press.
 Pridgeon, A.M., Cribb, P.J., Chase, M.A. & Rasmussen, F. eds. (2003). Genera Orchidacearum 3. Oxford Univ. Press
 Berg Pana, H. 2005. Handbuch der Orchideen-Namen. Dictionary of Orchid Names. Dizionario dei nomi delle orchidee. Ulmer, Stuttgart

Polystachyinae
neobenthamia
Orchids of Africa
Endemic flora of Tanzania